Florin Mergea and Horia Tecău were the defending champions, but they did not compete in the Juniors this year.

Brendan Evans and Scott Oudsema defeated Robin Haase and Viktor Troicki in the final, 6–4, 6–4 to win the boys' doubles tennis title at the 2004 Wimbledon Championships.

Seeds

  Alex Kuznetsov /  Mischa Zverev (quarterfinals)
  Brendan Evans /  Scott Oudsema (champion)
  Jun Woong-sun /  Kim Sun-yong (first round)
  Rafael Arévalo /  Coen van Keulen (semifinals)
  Karan Rastogi /  Yi Chu-huan (quarterfinals)
  Guillermo Alcaide /  Sergei Bubka (semifinals)
  Scoville Jenkins /  Miles Kasiri (first round)
  Kamil Čapkovič /  Lukáš Lacko (quarterfinals)

Draw

Finals

Top half

Bottom half

References

External links

Boys' Doubles
Wimbledon Championship by year – Boys' doubles